Royal Infirmary may refer to a number of hospitals in the United Kingdom:

England
Blackburn Royal Infirmary
Bradford Royal Infirmary
Bolton Royal Infirmary
Bristol Royal Infirmary
Chester Royal Infirmary
Derbyshire Royal Infirmary
Doncaster Royal Infirmary
Gloucestershire Royal Infirmary
Royal Halifax Infirmary
Huddersfield Royal Infirmary
Hull Royal Infirmary
Lancaster Royal Infirmary
Leicester Royal Infirmary
Liverpool Royal Infirmary
Royal Infirmary for Children and Women, Lambeth, London
Manchester Royal Infirmary
Royal Victoria Infirmary, Newcastle
North Staffordshire Royal Infirmary
Preston Royal Infirmary
Salford Royal Infirmary
Sheffield Royal Infirmary
Scotland
Aberdeen Royal Infirmary
Dumfries and Galloway Royal Infirmary
Dundee Royal Infirmary
Edinburgh Royal Infirmary
Falkirk Royal Infirmary
Glasgow Royal Infirmary
Greenock Royal Infirmary
Montrose Royal Infirmary
Perth Royal Infirmary
Stirling Royal Infirmary
Wales
Cardiff Royal Infirmary